Snakebite is the first official release by the British hard rock band Whitesnake. The original EP initially featured only four tracks and was released in the UK in June 1978 and never published in the US. Snakebite was re-released in September 1978 as a Double Extended Play containing four extra studio tracks taken from David Coverdale's second solo album Northwinds. The EP sleeve is entitled David Coverdale's Whitesnake and features photographs of the live band in concert. All tracks from the original EP also were used as bonus tracks on the 2006 remaster of Whitesnake's debut studio album Trouble.

Background and writing
Shortly after producing and then touring in support of Northwinds, Coverdale found that his new band was already producing and testing new material. Thus they returned to the studio to capture this newfound energy.

The resulting mini-album (Snakebite EP) features the cover song "Ain't No Love in the Heart of the City", originally performed by Bobby Bland. Although it is now considered a classic Whitesnake song, according to Coverdale it wasn't planned that way: "Originally I had no plans to actually record ‘Ain’t No Love in the Heart of the City’… if you can you believe it… a song that connects so deeply with so many that I still play it today, 25 years later."

Some of the songs from this album would be captured later in 1978 and released on the 1980 Live...In the Heart of the City live album.

Track listing

Side A 
 "Bloody Mary" (Coverdale) – 3:16
 "Steal Away" (Coverdale, Micky Moody, Marsden, Neil Murray, Peter Solley, Dave Dowle) – 4:15

Side B 
 "Ain't No Love in the Heart of the City" (Michael Price, Dan Walsh) – 5:05
 "Come On" (David Coverdale, Bernie Marsden) – 3:25

David Coverdale's Whitesnake – Snakebite

 "Come On" (David Coverdale, Bernie Marsden) – 3:31
 "Bloody Mary" (Coverdale) – 3:18
 "Ain't No Love in the Heart of the City" (Michael Price, Dan Walsh) – 5:07
 "Steal Away" (Coverdale, Micky Moody, Marsden, Neil Murray, Peter Solley, Dave Dowle) – 4:16
 "Keep On Giving Me Love" (Coverdale, Moody) – 5:13
 "Queen of Hearts" (Coverdale, Moody)  – 5:15
 "Only My Soul" (Coverdale) – 4:33
 "Breakdown" (Coverdale, Moody)  – 5:12

 Tracks 1-4 are from the original EP, recorded 7–13 April 1978 at Central Recorders, London.
 Tracks 5-8 are from the Northwinds album, recorded 10–19 April 1977 at AIR Studios, London.

Personnel

Tracks 1-4
David Coverdale – vocals
Micky Moody – guitar
Bernie Marsden – guitar
Neil Murray – bass guitar
Dave Dowle – drums
Pete Solley - keyboards

Tracks 5-8
David Coverdale - vocals
Micky Moody - guitar
Tim Hinkley – piano
Alan Spenner – bass
Tony Newman – drums
Lee Brilleaux – harmonica
Roger Glover – clavinet, cowbell, Arp 2600
 – violin

Charts

References

Whitesnake EPs
1978 debut EPs
United Artists Records albums
Albums produced by Martin Birch
Albums produced by Roger Glover
EMI Records EPs
Hard rock EPs
Blues rock EPs